"What Difference Does It Make?" is a song by the English rock band the Smiths, written by singer Morrissey and guitarist Johnny Marr. It was the band's third single and is featured on their debut album, The Smiths. A different version, recorded for the John Peel Show on BBC Radio 1, is included in the compilation album Hatful of Hollow.

The song was one of the band's first significant chart hits, peaking at No. 12 in the UK Singles Chart.

Background
The character Ray Smith in the Jack Kerouac novel The Dharma Bums repeatedly says "What difference does it make?" as well as "Pretty girls make graves", the title of another track featured on The Smiths.

"What Difference Does It Make?" was released without an accompanying music video. Speaking to Tony Fletcher on The Tube in 1984, Morrissey remarked that he felt that the video market was something that was going to "die very quickly", and that he wanted to "herald the death" of it.

Cover artwork

The single cover is a photograph of Terence Stamp, taken on the set of the film The Collector. Originally Stamp denied permission for the still to be used, and some pressings featured Morrissey in a re-enacted scene. In the re-enactment, Morrissey is holding a glass of milk, as opposed to a chloroform pad in the original. However, Stamp soon changed his mind, and the covers featuring Morrissey are now very rare and collectible.

Track listings

Personnel
 Morrissey – lead vocals
 Johnny Marr – guitars
 Andy Rourke – bass guitar
 Mike Joyce – drums

Charts

Certifications

References

The Smiths songs
1984 singles
1984 songs
Rough Trade Records singles
Songs written by Johnny Marr
Songs written by Morrissey